The Sensation of Sight is a feature film produced by independent film company Either/Or Films. Shot in 2005 and completed in 2006, it was written and directed by Aaron Wiederspahn and stars David Strathairn, Ian Somerhalder, Daniel Gillies, Jane Adams, Ann Cusack, Elisabeth Waterston, Joseph Mazzello, and Scott Wilson.

The Sensation of Sight made its world premiere at the San Sebastian International Film Festival in 2006 and was an official selection in 19 film festivals on five continents, including the Durban International Film Festival, where it won the festival's Best Cinematography award for cinematographer Christoph Lanzenberg. The Sensation of Sight has been shown in festivals in Brazil, China, Lithuania, and Poland, and made its U.S. premiere at the Denver Film Festival, followed by festival showings throughout the U.S.

In the summer of 2008, distributor Monterey Media gave the film a limited theatrical release, followed by a DVD release in the fall.

The film was shot entirely in the town of Peterborough, New Hampshire.

Review 
The film scored moderate reviews with Rotten Tomatoes rating it at 50% from six reviews.

References

External links

 Film website

2006 films
2006 drama films
American drama films
Films shot in New Hampshire
2000s American films